Paul Gilson (Brussels, 15 June 1865 – Brussels, 3 April 1942) was a Belgian musician and composer.

Biography
Paul Gilson was born in Brussels.  In 1866, his family moved to Ruisbroek in the Belgian province of Brabant. There he studied theory with the organist and choir director Auguste Cantillon, and began writing works for orchestra and choir. His first official training came from 1887–1889 under François-Auguste Gevaert in composition and under Charles Duyck in harmony and counterpoint at the Brussels Conservatory, and in 1889, he was awarded the Belgian Prix de Rome for a cantata, Sinaï, which was very well received. As the winner of the prize he was able to spend time in Bayreuth (1892), Paris (1893–4) and Italy (1895).

A large orchestral work, La mer, which was first performed in Brussels on 20 March 1892, established Gilson as a national musical figure and also gave him success abroad, though not in Paris.

In 1899 he became professor of composition at the Brussels Conservatory; he won the same post at Antwerp in 1904 but quit both after becoming inspector of music education in 1909, a post he would keep until 1930. Although he was a very prolific composer, his output decreased after 1905, after which Gilson wrote increasingly about music, in theory, criticism, and composition.

In 1925, a group of Gilson's students who called themselves Les Synthétistes (including René Bernier, Francis de Bourguignon, Théo De Joncker, Marcel Poot, Maurice Schoemaker, Jules Strens and Robert Otlet) first formed, declaring allegiance to Gilson's ideas about music. Along with Poot and Schoemaker, he founded La revue belge musicale in 1924; he was the chief editor until it folded in 1939. He also wrote pamphlets for Belgian radio.

Gilson corresponded regularly with Russian composers César Cui and Mitrofan Belyayev.  He died in his native city of Brussels.

Honours 
 1932 : commander in the Order of Leopold.

Music
Gilson was somewhat conservative in his musical outlook. Some of his work is indebted to Wagnerian harmony, and his books on harmony and instrumentation also bear this out.

La Mer, the score which gave him his greatest success, is a set of four impressionistic movements ("symphonic sketches") in sonata form which were originally intended to illustrate verses by a French-speaking poet, Eddy Levis. Generally considered to form a programmatic symphony depicting the sea, Gilson's score (also known as De Zee) predated Claude Debussy's work of the same name by a decade. Despite being finely crafted, his later works such as the oratorio  Francesca da Rimini tended to be somewhat conventional, lacking the originality displayed in the orchestration of La Mer. An exception is the brilliant Variations symphoniques (originally scored for brass ensemble), which is also the composer's only major work without literary associations.

Works

For orchestra 
 1890 Alla Marcia rhapsody for string orchestra
 1890 Rhapsodie à la marcia
 1892 La Mer 4 Symphonic sketches
 Lever de soleil
 Chants et danses de matelots
 Crépuscule
 Tempête
 1892–1893 Mélodies écossaises for string orchestra
 The Flowers Of The Forest
 Sweet May Morning
 Jig And Song
 1900 Ouverture symphonique Nr. 1
 Alvar
1902 Premier Concerto for Alto Saxophone
1902 Deuxième Concerto for Alto Saxophone
 1903 Ouverture symphonique Nr. 2
 1904 Ouverture symphonique No. 3
 1910 Inaugural Fanfare for the Coronation of Albert I
 1929 Parafrazen op vlaamse volksliederen
 Sailors Dance

For wind orchestra 
 1891 Fantaisie canadienne (Published by Breitkopf & Härtel as Fantasie über kanadische Volksweisen in 1898)
 1903 Variation symphonique for brass instruments
 1892/1925 La Mer 4 Symphonic Sketches for wind orchestra transcribed by Arthur Prevost
 Lever de soleil
 Chants et danses de matelots
 Crépuscule
 Tempête
 1930 Tornacum
 1930 Grande marche du Centenaire
 1948 Moeder for speaker and fanfare orchestra
 Binche
 Brabant – marche militaire
 Danse guerrière from the ballet La Captive
 Deuxième rhapsodie
 Deuxième valse symphonique
 Encore un ! allegro
 Epithalame
 Gavotte Monsignore
 Hommage à Weber
 Interlude solennel
 L'heureux voyage
 Le retour au pays : Prière avant le départ
 Marche commémorative
 Marche cortège
 Marche panégyrique
 Merxem – Allegro militaire
 Montréal – Allegro de concert
 Ouverture »Eleusines«
 Patrouille albanaise
 Poème symphonique en forme d'ouverture
 Polka fantaisiste
 Rhapsodie laudative
 Rhapsodie hawaïenne
 Richard III Ouverture
 Terugkeer naar het vaderland
 Triumph Marsch
 Variations
 Valse symphonique nr. 1
 Valse symphonique nr. 2
 Vestris – Danse mimique
 Quarantenaire – Marche solennelle

Stage works 
 1890 Le démon Dramatic cantata on a text by Lermontov in 2 acts for soloists, choir and orchestra
 1892 Francesca da Rimini Dramatic oratorio based on a text by Dante for soloists, choir and orchestra
 1895 Gens de mer (Zeevolk) Lyric drama in 2 acts
 1896–1900 La captive Ballet in 2 acts
 1903 Princesse Rayon de Soleil (Prinses Zonneschijn), légende féerique en quatre  actes
 1910 Les aventuriers (Rooversliefde) Musical drama in 1 act
 1910–1921 Les deux bossus, ballet-Pantomime in 1 Act
 1940 Elijah Music for a play by Cyriel Verschaeve
 Daphné Ballett

Other works 
 1889–1890 Six mélodies
 1902 Petite suite rustique for piano
 1934 Le mas d'Icare for a film by Carlo Queeckers for string orchestra
 1926 Sonatina for carillon
 1934–1936 Romantische werkjes
 1940 Aria di Timpani con 6 Variazioni
 Suite nocturne for piano
 Six chansons écossaises based on a text by Leconte de Lisle

Arrangements 
Scheherazade arrangement of the symphonic suite by Nicolai Rimsky-Korsakov for solo piano

Books and writings 
 1913 Le Tutti orchestral
 1923 Traité de lecture musicale
 1923 Traité d'harmonie (3 Bände)
 1926 Traité de musique militaire
 Solfège – Cours complet de la lecture musicale en neuf volumes
 1942 Notes de musique et souvenirs (memoirs)
 1955 Arthur Meulemans: Paul Gilson (1865–1942)

References

External links
 
 Koninklijk Conservatorium Brussel now houses most works and manuscripts of Gilson, after the bankruptcy of CeBeDeM in 2015.

1865 births
1942 deaths
19th-century classical composers
19th-century Belgian male musicians
20th-century classical composers
20th-century Belgian male musicians
Belgian classical composers
Belgian male classical composers
Composers for carillon
Concert band composers
Musicians from Brussels
Prix de Rome (Belgium) winners
Romantic composers
Royal Conservatory of Brussels alumni
Academic staff of the Royal Conservatory of Brussels